Samuel Short (born 17 September 2003) is an Australian international swimmer. He has represented Australia at the Commonwealth Games and won a silver medal.

Biography
Short competed at the 2022 World Aquatics Championships in the 1500 metres freestyle despite finishing early by mistake in the National trials.

In 2022, he was selected for the 2022 Commonwealth Games in Birmingham where he competed in the men's 400 metres freestyle, reaching the final and winning a silver medal.

References

2003 births
Living people
Australian male swimmers
Swimmers at the 2022 Commonwealth Games
Commonwealth Games medallists in swimming
Commonwealth Games gold medallists for Australia
Commonwealth Games silver medallists for Australia
21st-century Australian people
Sportsmen from Queensland
Medallists at the 2022 Commonwealth Games